The Railway Operating Division (ROD) ROD 2-8-0 is a type of 2-8-0 steam locomotive which was the standard heavy freight locomotive operated in Europe by the ROD during the First World War.

ROD need for a standard locomotive
During the First World War the Railway Operating Division of the Royal Engineers requisitioned about 600 locomotives of various types from thirteen United Kingdom railway companies; the first arrived in France in late 1916. As the war became prolonged it became clear that the ROD needed its own standard locomotive, so the ROD adopted the Great Central Railway Class 8K 2-8-0 designed by John G. Robinson in 1911.

Procurement of RODs
There were three batches of orders. The first batch of orders were placed between February and June 1917 for 223 locomotives. The second batch of orders was for 100 locomotives, placed between February and August 1918; onwards, followed by an order for 188 more in Autumn 1918 to sustain the UK's locomotive manufacturing industry after the war. The 521 ROD 2-8-0s were built as follows: 369 by the North British Locomotive Company, 82 by Robert Stephenson and Company, 32 by Nasmyth, Wilson and Company, 32 by Kitson and Company and six by the Great Central Railway's Gorton Works.

RODs in continental Europe
Of the initial order for 325 locomotives, 311 were shipped to France for war service. The locomotives were mainly used to haul military supply and troop trains, plus some services for civilians.

After the Armistice of 11 November 1918 many of the class returned from France to the UK in 1919 and 1920.  One ROD 2-8-0 duty remaining until the latter year was a through troop train from Cologne to Calais.

Post-war use in Great Britain
After the war British railway companies had a backlog of locomotives that required overhaul and repair: 498 ROD 2-8-0s were loaned to nine railway companies between 1919 and 1921 to cover goods traffic while the backlog was cleared. The ROD 2-8-0s were then placed into storage around the country until they were disposed of.

They were then sold as follows:

The Great Western Railway bought 20 ROD locos in 1919 and a further 80 in 1925.  The locomotives were widely spread over much of the GWR system, being used on heavy freight trains. The first withdrawals were made in 1927, but 45 survived to be taken over by British Railways in 1948 and the last three survivors were not withdrawn until October 1958.

The London and North Western Railway bought 30 locos in 1920. In the grouping in 1923 these entered the stock of the London, Midland and Scottish Railway, which bought another 75 of the class in 1927. The ROD's range of operations on the LMS was restricted by its high axle loading. Withdrawals began in 1928 and the last was gone by 1932. Some of the LMS examples were exported to China as China Railway KD4.

The largest purchaser of the RODs was the London and North Eastern Railway which bought 273 between late 1923 and early 1927 to supplement its 130 existing GCR Class 8K locos. The combined fleet served widely throughout the LNER system and many were modified over the years to prolong their useful life. In 1941 the War Department requisitioned 92 locomotives for use overseas (see below). Withdrawal of the first ex-LNER RODs was made by British Railways in 1959 and the last was retired from the Doncaster area in April 1966.

Thirteen RODs were purchased direct from the UK War Department in the 1920s by J & A Brown and shipped to Australia, for use on the privately owned Richmond Vale Railway. The last of the 13 RODs was withdrawn in 1973 and three survive.

RODs in the Middle East
During the Second World War the War Department needed heavy freight engines so in September 1941 it requisitioned 92 LNER locos. 61 were RODs bought by the LNER in the mid-1920s and 31 were GCR Class 8K locos. They were shipped to Egypt and Palestine, where they worked on Egyptian State Railways, Palestine Railways, the Haifa, Beirut and Tripoli Railway between Palestine and Lebanon, the Chémin de Fer Damas-Hama et Prolongements in Syria, and Iraqi State Railways. Iraqi State Railways had six examples and designated them class RD: in March 1967 at least one remained in storage at Shalchiyah works outside Baghdad awaiting disposal. In 1952 the UK shipped a final five RODs to the Middle East. Some remained in service in the Suez Canal Zone until 1955, then passed into Egyptian State Railways  stock until withdrawal in 1961 and were all scrapped .

RODs in Australia

J & A Brown, a coal mining company in the Hunter Valley area of New South Wales, Australia, bought thirteen RODs to replace the older locos used on their Richmond Vale railway line. Nine of these were built by the North British Locomotive Company, three by the Great Central Railway and one by Kitson and Company. They were bought between March 1925 and March 1927. The first three locos arrived complete on the SS Boorara in February 1926 and were unloaded in Sydney and hauled to their home base at Hexham. In late 1927 the rest arrived in crates on Brown's new ship the SS Minmi on its maiden voyage to Hexham. The dismantled locos were gradually reassembled with the last locos not being complete until 1931, but all thirteen locos were never in service at the one time. The maximum number in service at any one time was ten during 1954. The class survived until 28 June 1973 when 24, was withdrawn.

Preservation of RODs

Three ROD 2-8-0s and one pre-war 8K have been preserved:
J&A Brown 20 (Ex-ROD 1984, North British No 22042) by the Dorrigo Steam Railway & Museum
J&A Brown 23 (Ex-ROD 2004, Gorton) was dismantled to investigate the feasibility of restoration in the mid 1990s. After the extent of works required was deemed too expensive at the time it was stored for nearly 20 years before undergoing a full static rebuild in 2016 and is now on public display at the Richmond Vale Railway Museum 
J&A Brown 24 (Ex-ROD 2003, Gorton) by the Dorrigo Steam Railway & Museum
Both ROD Locomotives preserved in Dorrigo served with the Allies in France.

References

Bibliography

https://web.archive.org/web/20150106175611/http://locodriver.co.uk/Vol06/Part09/03/index.html

Great Western Railway locomotives
Kitson locomotives
London, Midland and Scottish Railway locomotives
London and North Eastern Railway locomotives
Nasmyth, Wilson and Company locomotives
NBL locomotives
Preserved steam locomotives of New South Wales
Railway locomotives introduced in 1916
Railway Operating Division locomotives
Robert Stephenson and Company locomotives
Steam locomotives of China
Steam locomotives of Iraq
Steam locomotives of Lebanon
Steam locomotives of New South Wales
Steam locomotives of Mandatory Palestine
Steam locomotives of Syria
2-8-0 locomotives
Standard gauge steam locomotives of Great Britain
Standard gauge locomotives of Australia
Standard gauge locomotives of China
Standard gauge steam locomotives of Egypt
Standard gauge locomotives of Iraq
Standard gauge locomotives of Lebanon
Standard gauge locomotives of Mandatory Palestine
Standard gauge locomotives of Syria
Freight locomotives